Mondo a go go may refer to:

 Mondo A Go-Go, a mini album by British electronic music band Eat Static
 Mondo A-Go Go,  an amusement park seen in the television movie Ed, Edd n Eddy's Big Picture Show